Carla Morera Rincón (born 17 March 1995) is a Spanish footballer who plays as a defender for Alavés.

Club career
Morera started her career at Cerdanyola del Vallès.

References

External links
Profile at La Liga

1995 births
Living people
Women's association football defenders
Spanish women's footballers
People from Vallès Occidental
Sportspeople from the Province of Barcelona
Footballers from Catalonia
Sportswomen from Catalonia
SD Eibar Femenino players
Primera División (women) players
Segunda Federación (women) players